The European Journal of Nuclear Medicine and Molecular Imaging (EJNMMI) is a peer-reviewed medical journal published by Springer. It is the official journal of the European Association of Nuclear Medicine. It covers the field of nuclear medicine, including dosimetry, radiation biology, radiochemistry, radiopharmacology, molecular imaging probes, reporter gene assays, cell trafficking, targeting of endogenous gene expression, and antisense methodologies. According to the Journal Citation Reports, the journal has a 2020 impact factor of 9.236.

Spin off 
In summer of 2011, Springer launched EJNMMI Research, a peer-reviewed open access journal, as a companion to the EJNMMI. It accommodates articles that could not be published in EJNMMI.

References

External links
 
 European Association of Nuclear Medicine
 EJNMMI Research

Springer Science+Business Media academic journals
Radiology and medical imaging journals
Monthly journals
English-language journals
Publications established in 1976
Open access journals